Khabkaymakhi (Dargwa: ХӀябкьяймахьи) is a rural locality (a selo) in Aymaumakhinskoye Rural Settlement, Sergokalinsky District, Republic of Dagestan, Russia. The population was 83 as of 2010. There is 1 street.

Geography 
Khabkaymakhi is located 20 km southwest of Sergokala (the district's administrative centre) by road. Aymaumakhi and Chabazimakhi are the nearest rural localities.

Nationalities 
Dargins live there.

References 

Rural localities in Sergokalinsky District